Alexander Walker (10 July 1842 – 15 June 1903) was a Scottish cricketer. He played in two first-class matches in New Zealand for Canterbury from 1866 to 1870.

See also
 List of Canterbury representative cricketers

References

External links
 

1842 births
1903 deaths
Scottish cricketers
Canterbury cricketers